Denmark competed at the 2019 European Games, in Minsk, Belarus from 21 to 30 June 2019. Denmark had previously competed at the 2015 European Games in Baku, Azerbaijan, where it won 12 medals, including four golds.

Medalists

Archery

Recurve

Compound

Athletics

Individual

Team

Badminton

Boxing

Canoe sprint

Men

Women

Gymnastics

Trampoline
Men

Judo 

Men

Women

Karate 

Katrine Pedersen competed in the women's kumite 68 kg event.

Shooting

Men

Women

Mixed

Table tennis

Men

Team

References

Nations at the 2019 European Games
European Games
2019